Sheriff Mill Complex, also known as Sheriff Place, is a historic grist mill complex located near Easley, Pickens County, South Carolina.  The complex includes a main house, gristmill, miller's house, millpond, and dam.  They date to the late-19th and early-20th centuries.  The grist mill was built in 1881, and is a -story, frame structure.  It remained in operation until 1955.  The main house was built about 1898–1899, and is a two-story, frame I-house with a rear ell.

It was listed on the National Register of Historic Places in 1987.

References 

Grinding mills on the National Register of Historic Places in South Carolina
Houses on the National Register of Historic Places in South Carolina
Industrial buildings completed in 1881
Houses completed in 1899
Houses in Pickens County, South Carolina
National Register of Historic Places in Pickens County, South Carolina
Grinding mills in South Carolina
Easley, South Carolina
1881 establishments in South Carolina